The Avenger is the second full-length studio album by Swedish death metal band Amon Amarth, released by Metal Blade Records and Sony Music on 2 September 1999. It was the first Amon Amarth album with guitarist Johan Söderberg and drummer Fredrik Andersson, Thus completing the line-up that remained up until 2015, following Andersson's departure from the band.  It was also released as a digipak version, containing a bonus track "Thor Arise", a re-recording of the title track from their first demo, Thor Arise. The album was also released as an LP version. Later, Metal Blade Records re-released the album in 2005 on Picture LP, limited to 500 hand-counted copies. A deluxe edition was released in 2009 that featured the album remastered by Jens Bogren, and a bonus cd of the original album played live in its entirety in Bochum, Germany.

Quote and feud
Exact quote for the album, by the band:

The quote was a result of a short-lived feud with heavy metal band HammerFall, and fears consumers and press alike viewed the album as unoriginal or a near-cover work of another band.

Track listing

Personnel
 Fredrik Andersson − drums
 Olavi Mikkonen − lead guitars
 Johan Hegg − vocals
 Johan Söderberg − rhythm guitars
 Ted Lundström − bass
 Engineered and mixed by Peter Tägtgren.
 Mastered at Cutting Room in Stockholm by Peter In De Betou, April 1999.
 Cover and layout by Thomas Everhard.

References

Amon Amarth albums
Metal Blade Records albums
1999 albums
Albums produced by Peter Tägtgren